KBU may refer to

Kasem Bundit University
Copenhagen Football Association, Københavns Boldspil-Union
Gusti Syamsir Alam Airport IATA code